John Scott was one of two Members of the Parliament of England for the constituency of York from 1661 to 1664.

Life and politics

The son of John Scott, Dean of York Minster, John was educated at Christ's College, Cambridge. His father is reported to have died in debtor's prison, which led to hardships for his son.

He was a major in the Royalist Army during the English Civil War. He served in the Spanish Army between 1656 and 1658. He became a freeman of the city of York in 1661. He was returned as MP for the city in 1661. This was in place of the expected candidate, Sir Thomas Widdrington.

Scott died in the autumn of 1664.

References

Members of the Parliament of England for constituencies in Yorkshire
English MPs 1661–1679
1664 deaths
Year of birth missing